Udea viridalis is a moth in the family Crambidae. It was described by Paul Dognin in 1904. It is found in Ecuador.

References

viridalis
Invertebrates of Ecuador
Moths of South America
Moths described in 1904